Seyyed Hoseyn (also Romanized as Seyyed Ḩoseyn; also known as Beyt-e Seyyed Ḩoseyn-e Fāẕelī) is a village in Ahudasht Rural District, Shavur District, Shush County, Khuzestan Province, Iran. At the 2006 census, its population was 34, in 8 families.

References 

Populated places in Shush County